Oberlin USD 294 is a public unified school district headquartered in Oberlin, Kansas, United States.  It includes the communities of Oberlin, Norcatur, Dresden (north of highway 383), Jennings (north of highway 383), Clayton (west of County Rd W-15 and north of highway 383), Cedar Bluffs, Traer, Kanona, Lyle, Reager, and nearby rural areas.

Schools
The school district operates the following schools:
 Decatur Community Junior-Senior High School
 Oberlin Elementary School

History
In 2006, Prairie Heights USD 295 underwent a dissolution. Hoxie USD 412 took a majority of the students, the rest merged into Oberlin USD 294.

In 2007 the school board considered instituting all-day kindergarten.

In 2007 the school board selected Pat Cullen as the superintendent; at the time Cullen was the superintendent of the Brady Public School District.

See also
 Kansas State Department of Education
 Kansas State High School Activities Association
 List of high schools in Kansas
 List of unified school districts in Kansas

References

External links
 

School districts in Kansas
Decatur County, Kansas